Venus in the East is a 1919 American silent comedy film directed by Donald Crisp, written by Gardner Hunting and Wallace Irwin, and starring Bryant Washburn, Margery Wilson, Anna Q. Nilsson, Guy Oliver, Clarence Burton, and Julia Faye. It was released on January 26, 1919, by Paramount Pictures.

Plot

Cast
Bryant Washburn as Buddy McNair
Margery Wilson as Martha
Anna Q. Nilsson as Mrs. Pat Dyvenot
Guy Oliver as Doc Naylor
Clarence Burton as Pontius Blint
Julia Faye as Doric Blint
Helen Dunbar as Mrs. Blint
Arthur Edmund Carewe as Middy Knox
Henry A. Barrows as Terrill Overbeck
Clarence Geldart as Jass
Charles K. Gerrard as Maddie Knox

Preservation
With no copies of Venus in the East located in any film archives, it is a lost film.

References

External links

 
 

1919 films
1910s English-language films
Silent American comedy films
1919 comedy films
Paramount Pictures films
Films directed by Donald Crisp
Lost American films
American black-and-white films
American silent feature films
1919 lost films
Lost comedy films
1910s American films